The men's 110 metres hurdles was the first of the track and field events on the athletics programme at the 1900 Summer Olympics in Paris. It was held on July 14, 1900. Nine athletes from three nations competed in the shortest of the hurdling events. The event was won by Alvin Kraenzlein of the United States, the second of five consecutive victories for the nation in the first five Olympic Games. It was also the first of four consecutive podium sweeps for the Americans in the event.

Background

This was the second appearance of the event, which is one of 12 athletics events to have been held at every Summer Olympics. None of the hurdlers from 1896 returned. Alvin Kraenzlein was the dominant hurdler of the time and an overwhelming favorite.

India made its first appearance in the event. France and the United States each made their second appearances, the only two nations to compete in the 110 metres hurdles in both the first two Games.

Competition format

There were three rounds: semifinals, repechages, and a final. The top runners in each of the 3 semifinal heats advanced to the final, while all other finishers in the heats moved to the repechages. Two repechage heats were held, with the winner of each advancing to the final.

Records

These were the standing world and Olympic records (in seconds) prior to the 1900 Summer Olympics. No world record was recognized until 1912, when the IAAF recognized a 1908 performance as the first world record. Alvin Kraenzlein's 15.2 seconds in the 120 yards (slightly shorter) was the closest equivalent.

At first Alvin Kraenzlein set a new Olympic record in the first heat of the first round with 15.6 seconds. In the final he improved this to 15.4 seconds.

Schedule

Results

Semifinals

In the first round, there were three heats. The top runners in each advanced to the finals, with the other runners competing in repechage heats.

Semifinal 1

Kraenzlein set a new world record and won by three yards, though he was slower than his previous mark of 15.2 seconds in the slightly shorter 120 yard hurdles.

Semifinal 2

Klingelhoefer pulled up lame, leaving Pritchard to win by a yard and a half.

Semifinal 3

There was no competition in this heat, with the only hurdler advancing automatically.

Repechage

The two repechage heats consisted of all the hurdlers that had not qualified in the first round, except for the injured Adolphe Klingelhoefer, who withdrew. The winner of each heat joined the three top finishers of the first round in the final.

Repechage heat 1

Repechage heat 2

McLean won the second repechage heat easily to become the third person from the first preliminary heat to qualify for the final.

Final

McLean had a lead early, due in part to the error of the starter; even so, Kraenzlein was able to catch and pass him to win the first athletics competition of the 1900 Games, and Moloney, a better hurdler than McLean, nearly caught him as well. All three of the American hurdlers had come from the first preliminary heat. Pritchard, the winner of the second heat, pulled up lame.

Results summary

References

Sources
 International Olympic Committee.
 De Wael, Herman. Herman's Full Olympians: "Athletics 1900". Accessed 18 March 2006.
 

Men's hurdles 110 metres
Sprint hurdles at the Olympics